The Roman Catholic Church in Poland comprises mainly sixteen Latin ecclesiastical provinces, each headed by a Metropolitan, whose Archdioceses have a total of 28 suffragan Dioceses, each headed by a bishop. They are all members of the Episcopal Conference of Poland, one of the larger conferences in Europe, slightly smaller than Spain, but larger than the United Kingdom or Germany and by far the most established conference in all of Eastern Europe.

Furthermore, there are
 an exempt military ordinariate for the armed forces 
 the Eastern Catholic province of the Metropolitan Ukrainian Catholic Archeparchy of Przemyśl–Warszawa and its suffragans as a Byzantine Rite in Ukrainian language
 an Ordinariate for the Faithful of the Eastern Rites for all other non-Latin rites in Poland.

There is also an Apostolic Nunciature to Poland, as papal diplomatic (embassy-level) representation.

Current Latin Dioceses

Exempt Latin jurisdiction 
 Military Ordinariate of Poland (Ordynariat Polowy Wojska Polskiego)

Ecclesiastical province of Białystok 
 Metropolitan Archdiocese of Białystok
 Diocese of Drohiczyn
 Diocese of Łomża

Ecclesiastical province of Częstochowa 
 Metropolitan Archdiocese of Częstochowa
 Diocese of Radom
 Diocese of Sosnowiec

Ecclesiastical province of Gdańsk 
 Metropolitan Archdiocese of Gdańsk
 Diocese of Pelplin
 Diocese of Toruń

Ecclesiastical province of Gniezno 
 Metropolitan Archdiocese of Gniezno, the Polish primatial see
 Diocese of Bydgoszcz
 Diocese of Włocławek

Ecclesiastical province of Katowice 
 Metropolitan Archdiocese of Katowice
 Diocese of Gliwice
 Diocese of Opole

Ecclesiastical province of Kraków 
 Metropolitan Archdiocese of Kraków
 Diocese of Bielsko-Żywiec
 Diocese of Kielce
 Diocese of Tarnów

Ecclesiastical province of Łódź 
 Metropolitan Archdiocese of Łódź
 Diocese of Łowicz

Ecclesiastical province of Lublin 
 Metropolitan Archdiocese of Lublin
 Diocese of Sandomierz
 Diocese of Siedlce

Ecclesiastical province of Poznań 
 Metropolitan Archdiocese of Poznań
 Diocese of Kalisz

Ecclesiastical province of Przemyśl 
 Metropolitan Archdiocese of Przemyśl
 Diocese of Rzeszów
 Diocese of Zamość-Lubaczów

Ecclesiastical province of Szczecin-Kamień 
 Metropolitan Archdiocese of Szczecin-Kamień
 Diocese of Koszalin-Kołobrzeg
 Diocese of Zielona Góra-Gorzów

Ecclesiastical province of Warmia 
 Metropolitan Archdiocese of Warmia
 Diocese of Elbląg
 Diocese of Ełk

Ecclesiastical province of Warszawa 
 Metropolitan Archdiocese of Warszawa
 Diocese of Płock
 Diocese of Warszawa-Praga

Ecclesiastical province of Wrocław 
 Metropolitan Archdiocese of Wrocław
 Diocese of Legnica 
 Diocese of Świdnica

Current Eastern Catholic Dioceses

Ukrainian Catholic province of Przemyśl–Warszawa 
rite-specific particular church sui iuris : Byzantine Rite in Ukrainian language
 Metropolitan Ukrainian Catholic Archeparchy of Przemyśl–Warsaw 
 Ukrainian Catholic Eparchy of Olsztyn–Gdańsk
 Ukrainian Catholic Eparchy of Wrocław-Koszalin.

Exempt, joint for the other rites 
 Ordinariate for the Faithful of the Eastern Rites for all other non-Latin rites in Poland.

Defunct Dioceses 
Four Episcopal Titular bishoprics : Diocese of Chełm, Diocese of Pomezania, Diocese of Sejny, Diocese of Wigry.

Gallery of Archdioceses

See also 
 Roman Catholicism in Poland.
 Template: Roman Catholic dioceses of Poland

References

Sources and external links
 GCatholic.org.
 Catholic-Hierarchy entry. 
 http://www.episkopat.pl/

Poland
Catholic dioceses